This is a list of nominated candidates for the New Democratic Party in the 2011 federal election.

The party's list of candidates in 2011 included the largest number of women ever nominated by a major party in an election campaign, with 123 female candidates comprising 39.9 per cent of the party's total slate.

Newfoundland and Labrador – 7 seats

Prince Edward Island – 4 seats

Nova Scotia – 11 seats

New Brunswick – 10 seats

Quebec – 75 seats

Ontario – 106 seats

Manitoba – 14 Seats

Saskatchewan – 14 seats

Alberta – 28 seats

British Columbia – 36 seats

Yukon – 1 seat

Northwest Territories – 1 seat

Nunavut – 1 seat

See also
Results of the Canadian federal election, 2011
Results by riding for the Canadian federal election, 2011

References

External links
 New Democratic Party (Canada) website
 Elections Canada – List of Confirmed Candidates for the 41st General Election